Paracoeloglutus is a genus of flies from Chile in the family Dolichopodidae. It contains only one species, Paracoeloglutus chilensis. The generic name is a combination of the Greek word 'para' (meaning 'near') and Coeloglutus, a closely related genus. The specific name is derived from Chile, the country where P. chilensis was collected.

References

Dolichopodidae genera
Neurigoninae
Diptera of South America
Monotypic Diptera genera
Endemic fauna of Chile